The Northumberland Vikings are an American Football team based in Newcastle upon Tyne, United Kingdom, they compete in the BAFA National Leagues NFC 1 Central, the second level of British American football. They play at Druid Park and were formed in 2014 as the Newcastle Vikings . The Vikings entered the League in 2015 and after early success and a promotion they went on to lose in 2017  Division 1 Play-offs, shortly afterwards they announced that they had merged with BAFA Division 2 side Northumberland Lightning (formed in 2012). The new Vikings adopted the Northumberland title but retained their original colours, logo and continued to operate from Newcastle with the Lightning vacating their base at Ashington to absorb into the Vikings setup in Newcastle.

History
The Vikings were founded in 2014. They completed their associate period, playing games against the Yorkshire Rams, East Kilbride Pirates and fellow associate team, the Leeds Bobcats.

In the summer of 2014, they announced a partnership with the nearby Northumbria University's American Football team, the Mustangs, which saw a number of Viking coaches join the Mustang staff.

They were accepted into the league in 2015, and were placed in the newly formed BAFANL Division Two NFC North. The Vikings played divisional rivals the Glasgow Tigers in their first competitive match, coming away with a comprehensive 46-8 win.

Following the 2017 season in which the Vikings were beaten in the Division 1 play-offs, they announced that the club had merged with Division 2 side the Northumberland Lightning and that the club would be known as the "Northumberland Vikings" from the start of the 2018 season.

Logos & Uniforms
Their logo is a stylised Norseman, inspired by that of their namesakes, the Minnesota Vikings.

The Vikings home jersey is primarily white with a black trim, and red numbers. Their away jersey is reversed, being primarily black with a white trim. Their game pants are black, and their socks are red. Their kits are currently manufactured by Nike.

Druid Park

The Vikings play their home games at Druid Park, known for being the home of Gosforth RFC. The multi-purpose stadium has a modern synthetic pitch, and a capacity of 2,500.

Academy
In 2014, the Vikings launched a schools programme which has attracted over 250 cadet level players, while five youth teams were either formed or joined the Vikings' satellite programme this year. The North Durham Knights, Darlington Steam, Cramlington Phoenix, Washington Predators and the Team Valley Cavaliers have all played at least one fixture internally and provided players for the Vikings BAFANL Youth team.

Notes

External links
 Newcastle Vikings website
 Newcastle Vikings Facebook page
 Newcastle Vikings Twitter account

BAFA National League teams
2014 establishments in England
American football teams established in 2014
American football teams in England